The Rendille–Boni languages is a proposed subgroup of the Macro-Somali languages, belonging to the Cushitic family. The languages are spoken in Kenya. The hypothesis has been by now rejected, in favor of grouping Aweer as a member of the Somali languages, closely related to Garre.

Notes 

Languages of Kenya
East Cushitic languages